John Marion Hart (January 2, 1866 – December 12, 1955) was an American Democratic politician who served as a member of the Virginia Senate, representing the state's 4th district. Hart resigned his seat in the Senate before the expiration of his second term in order to accept appointment as collector of internal revenue for the Western District of Virginia by President Woodrow Wilson.

References

External links
 
 

1866 births
1955 deaths
Democratic Party Virginia state senators
People from Prince Edward County, Virginia